was a Japanese author.

Prizes 
 1978 Tanizaki Prize for Natsu (Summer, 夏)

English translations 
 The Genie and Her Magic Bottle, translated by Hanabusa, Prism International, Vol. 11, No. 2, Autumn 1971.

Selected works 
 Kinō to kyō no monogatari, 1948.
 Ōchō no bungaku, 1957.
 Shi no kage no shita ni, 1951.
 Shi no kage no shita ni, Tokyo : Shinzenbi Sha, 1947.
 Aishin to shishin to, 1950.
 Shishū, 1950.
 Tamashii no yoru no naka o, 1951.
 Nagai tabi no owari, 1952.
 Bungaku no miryoku, 1953.
 Bungaku no sōzō, 1953.
 Nakamura Shinʾichirō shū, 1953.
 Akutagawa Ryūnosuke, 1954.
 Yahanraku, 1954.
 Tsumetai tenshi, 1955.
 Yasei no onna, 1955.
 Akutagawa Ryūnosuke no sekai, 1956.
 Nagai Kafū kenkyū, 1956.
 Bungakuteki kankaku, 1959.
 Ōchō bungaku no sekai, 1963.
 Sengo bungaku no kaisō, 1963.
 Kyūkon, 1964.
 Joseiron nōto, 1967.
 Akutagawa Ryūnosuke no sekai, 1968.
 Genji monogatari no sekai, 1968.
 Kin no uo, 1968.
 Watakushi no hyakushō, 1968.
 Enkaku kannō, 1969.
 Hi no matsuri, 1969.
 Kindai bungaku e no gimon, 1970.
 Kokoro no sakeme, 1970.
 Nakamura Shinʾichirō chōhen zenshū, 1970.
 Seiō bungaku to watakushi, 1970.
 Shi no henreki, 1970.
 Hihyō no koyomi, 1971.
 Hyōka no shi, 1971.
 Rai Sanʾyō to sono jidai, 1971.
 Tachihara Michizō kenkyū, 1971.
  Hori Tatsuo, 1972.
 Kenreimonʾin Ukyō Daibu, 1972.
 Koji hakkutsu, 1972.
 Nakamura Shinʾichirō hyōron zenshū, 1972.
 Nakamura Shinʾichirō shū, 1972.
 Netsuaisha, 1972.
 Ai no hōtei, 1973.
 Nakamura Shinʾichirō tampen zenshū, 1973.
 Taiwahen, 1973.
 Tōi musume, 1973.
 Kinsei onna katagi, 1974.
 Koji hakkutsu, 1974.
 Kono hyakunen no shōsetsu, 1974.
 Ansen yawa, 1975.
 Bunshō tokuhon, 1975. 	
 Nihon koten ni miru sei to ai, 1975.
 Shiki, 1975.
 Shisetsu Genji monogatari, 1975.
 Yumegatari, 1975.
 Kodoku, 1976.
 Nagai kaifukuki (長い 回復期), Tōkyō : Seiga Shobō, 1976.
 Rai Sanʾyō to sono jidai, 1976.
 Shijin no niwa, 1976.
 Shinsei kazoku, 1976.
 Yowa no nezame, 1976.
 Taishō sakka ron, 1977.
 Meiji sakka ron, 1978.
 Monte Kurisuto Haku, c1978.
 Natsu (夏), 1978.
 Rensa hannō, 1978.
 Shinigao, 1978.
 Dokusho wa tanoshimi, 1979.
 Shōwa sakka ron, 1979.
 Akutagawa, Hori. Tachihara no bungaku to sei, 1980.
 Kioku no mori, 1980.
 Shōsetsu no hōhō : watakushi to "nijisseiki shōsetsu", Tokyo : Shūeisha, 1981.
 Toki no naka e no tabi, 1981.
 Hon o yomu, Tokyo : Shinchōsha, 1982.
 Shōsetsu kōsō e no kokoromi, Tōkyō : Shoritsu Kaze no Bara, 1982.
 Waga tenkibo, Tokyo : Shinchōsha, 1982.
  Eien no shojo, Tōkyō : Shinchōsha, 1983.
 Sengo bungaku no kaisō, Tōkyō : Chikuma Shobō, 1983.
 Watakushi no Seiō bungaku (私 の 西欧 文学), Tōkyō : Iwanami Shoten, 1984.
 Bungaku no hōhō (文学 の 方法), Tōkyō : Iwanami Shoten, 1984.
 Fuyu (冬), Tōkyō : Shinchōsha, 1984.
 Geijutsu o megutte (芸術 を めぐって), Tōkyō : Iwanami Shoten, 1984.
 Kindai no sakkatachi (近代 の 作家たち), Tōkyō : Iwanami Shoten, 1984.
 Nakamura Shinʾichirō gekishi shūsei (中村 真一郎 劇詩 集成), Tōkyō : Shichōsha, 1984.
 Watakushi no koten (私 の 古典), Tōkyō : Iwanami Shoten, 1984.
 Ōchō to Edo (王朝 と 江戶), Tōkyō : Kokusho Kankōkai,  1985.
 Yume no fukken (夢 の 復権), Tōkyō : Fukutake Shoten, 1985.
 Zoku Shōsetsu kōsō e no kokoromi (続・小說 構想 へ の 試み), Tōkyō : Shoshi Kaze no Bara : Hatsubaijo Seiunsha, 1985.
 Ai, jinsei, geijutsu (愛・人生・芸術), Tōkyō : Kokusho Kankōkai, 1985.
 Bungaku to kindai (文学 と 近代), Tōkyō : Kokusho Kankōkai, 1985.
 Dokusho-zanmai (読書三昧), Tōkyō : Shinchōsha, 1985.
 Edo kanshi (江戶 漢詩), Tōkyō : Iwanami Shoten, 1985.
 Gensō to sekai (幻想 と 世界), Tōkyō : Kokusho Kankōkai, 1985.
 Irogonomi no kōzō : ōchō bunka no shinsō (色好み の 溝造 : 王朝 文化 の 深層), Tōkyō : Iwanami Shoten, 1985.
 Kurui (狂), Tōkyō : Sakuhinsha, 1986.
 Shi o kangaeru (死 を 考える), Tōkyō : Chikuma Shobō, 1988.
 Hi no yama no monogatari : waga kaisō no Karuizawa (火 の 山 の 物語 : わが 回想 の 軽井沢), Tōkyō : Chikuma Shobō, 1988.
 Ai to bi to bungaku : waga kaisō (愛 と 美 と 文学 : わが 回想), Tōkyō : Iwanami Shoten, 1989.
 Midoriiro no jikan no naka de (绿色 の 時間 の なか で), Tōkyō : Chikuma Shobō, 1989.
 Haiku no tanoshimi (俳句 の たのしみ), Tōkyō : Shinchōsha, 1990.
 Hagiwara Sakutarō (萩原 朔太郎), Tōkyō : Ushio Shuppansha, 1991.
 Dokusho no yorokobi (読書 の よろこび ), Tōkyō : Shinchōsha, 1991.
 Shōsetsuka Henrī Jeimuzu (小說家 ヘンリー・ジェイムズ), Tōkyō : Shūeisha, 1991.
 Bungaku to shite no hyōden (文学 と して の 評伝), Tōkyō : Shinchōsha, 1992.
 Nakamura Shinʾichirō shōsetsu shūsei (中村 真一郎 小說 集成), Tōkyō : Shinchōsha, 1992-1993.
 Nyotai gensō (女体 幻想), Tōkyō : Shinchōsha, 1992.
 Shōsetsu to wa hontō wa nani ka (小說 と は 本当 は 何 か), Nagoya-shi : Kawai Bunka Kyōiku Kenkyūjo ; Tōkyō : Kawai Shuppan, 1992.
 Ōchō monogatari : shōsetsu no mirai ni mukete (王朝 物語 : 小說 の 未来 に 向けて), Tōkyō : Ushio Shuppansha, 1993.
 Ansen kūdan (暗泉 空談), Tōkyō : Shūeisha, 1994.
 Bungakuteki sanpo : zuisōshū (文学的 散步 : 随想集), Tōkyō : Chikuma Shobō, 1994.
 Dokusho no kairaku (読書 の 快楽), Tōkyō : Shinchōsha, 1994.
 Gendai bijo sugoroku (現代 美女 双六), Tōkyō : Kawade Shobō Shinsha, 1995.
 Saidoku Nihon kindai bungaku (再読 日本 近代 文学), Tōkyō : Shūeisha, 1995.
 Tamashii no bōryoku (魂 の 暴力), Tōkyō : Chūō Kōronsha, 1995.
 Waga kokoro no shijintachi : Tōson, Hakushū, Sakutarō, Tatsuji (わが 心 の 詩人たち : 藤村・白秋・朔太郎・達治), Tōkyō : Ushio Shuppansha, 1998.
 Nakamura Shinʾichirō (中村 真一郎), Tōkyō : Nihon Tosho Sentā, 2000.

Japanese writers
1918 births
1997 deaths